James Edward McAlister (September 5, 1951 – March 31, 2018) was an American football running back in the National Football League during the 1970s. He was drafted by the Oakland Raiders in the sixth round of the 1974 NFL Draft. He played college football at UCLA, where he was also a star on the track and field team. He had the best long jump in the world in 1973 set at home in Westwood.

In 1974, the World Football League gained a large measure of recognition the day before the NFL draft when the Southern California Sun announced the signing of three potential NFL first-round selections, including McAlister. McAlister was one of a trio whose agent, 22-year-old Michael L Trope, decided not to wait for competitive bidding by the NFL. "Their value was at a peak, 30% to 35% higher than it would have been later, because of the publicity the WFL could get by our signing," said Trope, who approximated the total package at close to $1 million for his three clients.

McAlister also played for the Philadelphia Eagles and New England Patriots. He was on the cover of Sports Illustrated in 1971.

McAlister died on March 31, 2018 in Corona, California.

References

1951 births
2018 deaths
Sportspeople from Little Rock, Arkansas
Players of American football from Pasadena, California
American male long jumpers
American football running backs
UCLA Bruins football players
Southern California Sun players
Philadelphia Eagles players
New England Patriots players
Track and field athletes from California
UCLA Bruins men's track and field athletes
Track and field athletes in the National Football League